The Lioré et Olivier LéO H-13 was a French biplane two-engine flying boat of the 1920s, built in passenger and military variants.

Development
The LeO H-13 was constructed by Lioré et Olivier in Levallois-Perret factory, for an order of the French Aeronavale airlines. The prototype was flown in July 1922. From 1923 23 passenger aircraft were built LeO H-13A.
 
Next, military variants were developed: reconnaissance-bomber LeO H-13B-3 and trainer LeO H-13E. They differed in fuselage configuration, because the H-13B-3 had an open cockpit for a pilot only behind a lower wing, while the H-13E had an open cockpit for a trainee and instructor seating side-by-side, in front of wings. Both had open machine gun positions in the nose and behind the wings. The H-13E could be also used as a reconnaissance aircraft. From late 1923 20 H-13B-3 were built (nos. 1-20) and 10 H-13E (nos. 21-30).

Variants
Data from: - Lioré et Olivier
LéO H-13
Prototype
LeO H-13bis
LéO H-13A
Passenger variant, 3 built
LéO H-13B-3
Reconnaissance-bomber variant, 20 built.
LéO H-13E
Trainer variant, 10 built.
LeO H-1322 built, powered by 2x Hispano-Suiza 8Aa engines.
LeO H-1334 built, powered by 2x  Renault 12F engines.
LeO H-1342 built, powered by 1x  Lorraine 12Eb engines.
LeO H-1357 built, powered by 2x  Hispano-Suiza 8Ab engines.
LeO H-13612 built for Aeronavale
Leo H-14Design studies for a 5-seat version of the H-13, not completed due to lack of interest from airlines.

Service
Passenger H-13A were used over the Mediterranean Sea.

In the French Navy, H-13 were quickly withdrawn for training purpose, because of weak structure and low manufacturing quality.

In 1924-1925 two H-13B3 and two H-13E were sold to Poland and used in Naval Aviation Unit (MDLot) in Puck from mid-1925. One of H-13E was used for a short time in a River Flotilla in Pińsk. The first H-13B-3 no. 1-1 was withdrawn in 1929, next two (nos. 1-2 and 1-3) in 1931, while the last H-13E, no. 1-4, crashed on 29 July 1931 over the land near Puck.

Description
Two-engine biplane flying boat of wooden construction. Wooden framed fuselage, plywood covered, rectangular in cross-section, with a flat bottom with a single step. Two-spar rectangular wings, covered with plywood (in front) and canvas. A lower wing attached to the fuselage, an upper wing above it, mounted on struts, with two engines between wings, driving tractor propellers. Two floats under a lower wing. Conventional braced empennage. Two 150 hp radial engines Hispano-Suiza 8E.

Armament: two twin 7.7 mm Lewis machine guns and 4 bombs up to 25 kg below a lower wing.

Operators

French Navy

Polish Navy

Specifications (LeO H-13B-3)

References

Bibliography

 Sankowski, Wojciech: "Pierwsze Francuzy" in: Lotnictwo z szachownicą nr 20

External links
Lioré et Olivier at Aviafrance

1920s French bomber aircraft
1920s French airliners
H-013
Flying boats
Biplanes
Twin piston-engined tractor aircraft
Aircraft first flown in 1922